Top Chef Thailand is a Thai reality competition television series. The show premiered on March 25, 2017 on ONE HD. The first season consisted of 13 episodes, with 15 contestants vying for a grand prize of ฿1,000,000. Contestants shopped at Makro Food Service. Contestants are judged by a panel of professional chefs and other notables from the food and wine industry, with one or more contestants being eliminated each week.

Hosts and Judges

Running time
 All times are Indochina Time (UTC+07:00).

Season 1

Season 2

Season 3
 TBA

Desserts
 TBA

Show Format
Quickfire Challenge round (Speed, skills, and solve unexpected problems test): The warm up competition for contestants before the Elimination Challenge. The winners of this competition will be eligible, which has the advantage of the next race. In this round, one contestant will be eliminated. (only in episode 1)
Elimination Challenge round (Knockout stage): The contestants prepare one or more dishes to meet the challenge requirements. In this round, at the least one contestant will be eliminated.
Elimination Quickfire Challenge (Special knockout stage): The special round in episode 12, this round is like the Quickfire Challenge round. In this round, at the least one contestant will be eliminated.

Seasons

References

External links 
 Facebook

Thai television series based on American television series
Thai television series
Thailand
2017 Thai television series debuts
Thai reality television series
One 31 original programming